Jonathan Martinez Florencio (Jon 'Flo' Florencio, born in Queens, New York on July 21, 1976) is a multiple-award winning composer, audio engineer and record producer. He is of Filipino descent and was raised in Bellmore, New York and attended Mepham High School. He has composed music for various commercials including Hummer, Nike, Scion, Calvin Klein, Mercedes, Rolex, Yves Saint Lauren, Pepsi and MTV. He has also worked with acts such as Ours, Glassjaw, Jimmy Gnecco, The Movielife, Dearly Departed, The Washdown, Anterrabae, and Woods. His production technique is notable for its width, innovative textures, and deconstructive approach to production.

In 2010 he worked on Jimmy Gnecco's debut solo-album The Heart (album). That same year, Florencio mixed three songs for The Narrative's self-titled album, as well as co-produced/engineered the Glassjaw EPs Our Color Green (The Singles) and Coloring Book.

Awards
Florencio won the First Boards Awards 2004 for his first year's work as a composer.  He also went on to win the 2004 London International Award for Best Original Music Scoring on a Calvin Klein commercial featuring Scarlett Johansson.

In 2008, Jonathan mixed select tracks for Ours, Mercy (Dancing for the Death of an Imaginary Enemy) album, produced by Rick Rubin.  The album was credited for Grammy Awards 'Producer Of The Year-Rick Rubin 2008'.

Jonathan's music was featured during the 2016 Super Bowl 50 broadcast.

References

1976 births
American male composers
21st-century American composers
Living people
Writers from Queens, New York
People from Bellmore, New York
21st-century American male musicians